The list of organisms by chromosome count describes ploidy or numbers of chromosomes in the cells of various plants, animals, protists, and other living organisms. This number, along with the visual appearance of the chromosome, is known as the karyotype, and can be found by looking at the chromosomes through a microscope. Attention is paid to their length, the position of the centromeres, banding pattern, any differences between the sex chromosomes, and any other physical characteristics. The preparation and study of karyotypes is part of cytogenetics.

References

Further reading 

  (table with a compilation of haploid chromosome number of many algae and protozoa, in column "HAP").
  Supporting Data Set, with information on ploidy level and number of chromosomes of several protists)

External links 
List of pages in English from Russian bionet site
The dog through evolution
Shared synteny of human chromosome 17 loci in Canids
An atlas of the chromosome numbers in animals (1951); PDF downloads of each chapter

Chromosomes
Classical genetics
Chromosome